Hal Hartley (born November 3, 1959) is an American film director, screenwriter, producer and composer who became a key figure in the American independent film movement of the 1980s and '90s. He is best known for his films The Unbelievable Truth, Trust, Simple Men, Amateur and Henry Fool, which are notable for deadpan humour and offbeat characters quoting philosophical dialogue.

His films provided a career launch for a number of actors, including Adrienne Shelly, Edie Falco, James Urbaniak, Martin Donovan, Karen Sillas and Elina Löwensohn. Hartley frequently scores his own films using his pseudonym Ned Rifle, and his soundtracks regularly feature music by indie rock acts Sonic Youth, Yo La Tengo and PJ Harvey.

Early life
Hartley was born in Lindenhurst on southern Long Island, New York, the son of an ironworker. Hartley had an early interest in painting and attended the Massachusetts College of Art in Boston where he studied art and developed an interest in filmmaking. In 1980, he was accepted to the filmmaking program at the State University of New York at Purchase in New York, where he met a core group of technicians and actors who would go on to work with him on his feature films, including his regular cinematographer Michael Spiller.

Feature films
Hartley shot his first feature film, The Unbelievable Truth, in 1988. Made on a shoestring budget and filmed in his native Long Island, it was an unconventional love story about a suburban Long Island teenager (played by Adrienne Shelly, a soon-to-be Hartley regular) falling in love with a handsome mechanic with a criminal past (Robert John Burke, also a soon-to-be Hartley regular). The screenplay featured what have become Hartley's trademarks – deadpan humour, offbeat, stilted, pause-filled dialogue, and characters posing philosophical questions about the meaning of life, combined with a degree of stylization in acting, choreography and camera movement. The film received positive reviews and was nominated for the Grand Jury Prize at the 1990 Sundance Film Festival, establishing Hartley as a distinctive new talent in the burgeoning independent filmmaking movement.

Hartley's next film, Trust (1990), followed similar themes and style to The Unbelievable Truth, again an offbeat romantic comedy starring Adrienne Shelly as a Long Island teenager who forms a complex romantic relationship with a mysterious computer repairman (played by Martin Donovan, another Hartley regular). Trust won the Waldo Salt Screenwriting Award at the 1991 Sundance Film Festival. Hartley followed this with the short feature Surviving Desire (1991), a romantic comedy about a college professor (Donovan) who has an affair with a student (Mary B. Ward). Simple Men (1992), a drama about two brothers (played by Burke and Bill Sage) who reunite to search for their anarchist father and encounter two women in a small town (Karen Sillas and Elina Löwensohn), was entered in competition at the 1992 Cannes Film Festival.

His next feature, Amateur (1994), marked a change of pace for Hartley, exploring more somber themes and with a more tragic tone. Described as "a metaphysical thriller", it starred the French actress Isabelle Huppert as a former nun 
trying to write pornographic fiction who meets Thomas (Martin Donovan), a man suffering from amnesia, and Sophia (Elina Löwensohn), Thomas's wife and a porn star who reveals that Thomas was a violent criminal and pornographer.

Hartley developed Flirt (1995) as an extension of his short film of the same name made in 1993. The film is a triptych of three separate characters involved in romantic entanglements in different cities – New York, Berlin and Tokyo – with each story using the same dialogue. The film stars Hartley regulars Bill Sage, Parker Posey, Martin Donovan, Dwight Ewell and the Japanese actress Miho Nikaido, whom Hartley married in 1996.

Later works
Hartley achieved his greatest commercial and critical success with his next feature, Henry Fool (1997), a darkly comic drama about a near-catatonic garbageman, Simon Grim (James Urbaniak), and his sister Fay (Parker Posey), who meet Henry Fool (Thomas Jay Ryan), a libertine and aspiring novelist who inspires Simon to write and seduces Fay and her depressed mother (Maria Porter). Simon's literary output, an epic poem written in blank verse, becomes a national sensation, winning acclaim and controversy for its pornographic content. Simon eventually becomes a literary celebrity, winning the Nobel Prize for Literature. While Henry's writing career fades, he is coerced into marrying Fay, whom he has gotten pregnant, and abandons writing and takes Simon's old job as a garbageman to support his family. The film garnered positive reviews and was entered into competition at the 1998 Cannes Film Festival, where Hartley won the Best Screenplay Award.

Hartley was invited to contribute the American entry to a series of films financed by French television to celebrate the 2000 millennium. His entry, a black comedy entitled The Book of Life (1998) was shot entirely on digital video in New York in 1998. The story imagines Jesus (Martin Donovan) returning to Earth on the eve of the 2000 millennium to open the Book of Life (stored on an Apple Mac laptop) which will start the Apocalypse. Jesus, accompanied by Mary Magdalene (singer-songwriter PJ Harvey) becomes enamoured of humanity and argues with Satan (Thomas Jay Ryan) as to whether or not to end human civilisation. The film also features Yo La Tengo, who appear as a Salvation Army band. Some sources state that William Burroughs is also featured, but according to Hartley, this is actually a shot of the film's production manager doing a Burroughs impression (plus the fact that Burroughs died the previous year). The film screened on French television and had a limited commercial release in cinemas.

Hartley's next feature No Such Thing (2001) tells the story of Beatrice (Sarah Polley), a journalist whose fiancé is killed by a monster in Iceland. Beatrice's editor (Helen Mirren) orders Beatrice to go to Iceland to interview the monster (Robert John Burke), who is a sensitive philosopher. The pair return to New York where the media turns them into celebrities. The film is intended as a satire of news media's obsession with celebrities and manipulating events to create news headlines. The film also stars Julie Christie as a doctor sympathetic to the monster's cause.  The film was screened in the Un Certain Regard section at the 2001 Cannes Film Festival.

The Girl from Monday (2005) continued Hartley's critical and satiric interest in media manipulation and the negative consequences of business monopolization and globalization. Filmed in New York City and Puerto Rico, the film is set in a future dystopia where people are encouraged to record their sexual encounters as an economic transaction and thus increase their consumer buying power. The film stars Bill Sage, Sabrina Lloyd and Tatiana Abracos. It premiered at the 2005 Sundance Film Festival and received a limited cinematic release, receiving mostly negative reviews.

In late 2005, Hartley moved from New York to Berlin and began preparing Fay Grim, an intended sequel to Henry Fool. The film, which starred Parker Posey, James Urbaniak and Thomas Jay Ryan reprising their roles from Henry Fool, was a comedy-drama in which Fay is coerced by a CIA agent (Jeff Goldblum) to try to locate notebooks that belonged to Henry (now a fugitive). Fay learns that the notebooks contain classified information that could compromise US security, leading Fay into a search around the world to find them. The film was shot in 2006 in locations in Berlin, Paris, and Istanbul and premiered at the 2006 Toronto International Film Festival. It had a limited cinematic release in 2007 and received mixed reviews.

Since 1999, Hartley's films have predominantly been shot with digital cameras, including the features The Book of Life, The Girl from Monday, Fay Grim and Meanwhile (2011), in addition to his short films. His digital aesthetic is significantly different from that seen in the 1990s, and his films shot by Michael Spiller on 35mm film, which exhibit blurring of the image (due to a very low shutter speed), the use of freeze frames, and shifts between colour and black-and-white footage, also display a considerable divergence from the washed-out colours and straightforward cinematography of the Long Island films from the early 1990s. Meanwhile received its World premiere at the Camerimage festival in Bydgoszcz, Poland on 29 November 2011. The hour-long feature was released on DVD in 2012 following a successful funding campaign by Hartley using the Kickstarter website.

In November 2013, Hartley funded Ned Rifle, the third film in the trilogy that began with Henry Fool and Fay Grim, via a Kickstarter campaign. The film premiered on September 7, 2014, at the 2014 Toronto International Film Festival.

Between 2015 and 2017, Hartley directed eight episodes of Red Oaks, an Amazon Studios comedy streaming television series.

Short films
In addition to his feature work, Hartley has made a number of short films, many of which have been collected and re-released in DVD anthologies.

Theatre
Hartley's stage play Soon, a drama dealing with the confrontation at Waco, Texas, between the religious community known as the Branch Davidians and the US federal government, was first produced at the Salzburg Festival and then later that year in Antwerp. It was also staged in the US in 2001.

Awards
In 1996, Hartley was made Chevalier of the Order of Arts and Letters of the French Republic.

From 2001 through 2004, Hartley was a visiting lecturer at Harvard University while simultaneously editing No Such Thing, shooting The Girl From Monday and writing Fay Grim.

Hartley was awarded a fellowship by The American Academy in Berlin in late 2004, where he did research related to a proposed large-scale project concerning the life of French educator and social activist Simone Weil.

Personal life
In 1996, Hartley married the Japanese dancer and actress Miho Nikaido, one of the stars of his film Flirt.

Filmography

Feature films
The Unbelievable Truth (1989)
Trust (1990)
Surviving Desire (1991)
Simple Men (1992)
Amateur (1994)
Flirt (1995)
Henry Fool (1997)
The Book of Life (1998)
No Such Thing (2001)
The Girl from Monday (2005)
Fay Grim (2006)
Meanwhile (2011)
Ned Rifle (2014)

Short films
Kid (1984)
The Cartographer's Girlfriend (1987)
Dogs (1988)
Ambition (1991)
Theory of Achievement (1991)
Flirt (1993)
Opera No. 1 (1994)
NYC 3/94 (1994)
Iris (1994)
The New Math(s) (2000)
Kimono (film) (2000)
The Sisters of Mercy (2004)
A/Muse (2010)
Implied Harmonies (2010)
The Apologies (2010)
Adventure (2010)
Accomplice (2010)

Streaming television
Red Oaks (2015–17)

References

External links

The Director Interviews: Hal Hartley, Fay Grim  at Filmmaker Magazine
Drinks with Tony podcast interview
Hal Hartley and Parker Posey Interview
Hammer to Nail interview
Literature on Hal Hartley

1959 births
American film directors
American male screenwriters
Living people
English-language film directors
People from Lindenhurst, New York
Massachusetts College of Art and Design alumni
State University of New York at Purchase alumni
Screenwriters from New York (state)
Cannes Film Festival Award for Best Screenplay winners